Oleg Petrovich Dmitrenko (born 20 July 1984) is a former Russian professional football player.

Club career
He played two seasons in the Russian Football National League for FC Dynamo Bryansk.

External links
 
 Career summary by sportbox.ru
 

1984 births
Living people
Russian footballers
Association football midfielders
FC Lokomotiv Kaluga players
FC Dynamo Bryansk players
FC Gornyak Uchaly players
FC Dynamo Barnaul players
FC Sakhalin Yuzhno-Sakhalinsk players